Olof Wallin (22 January 1913 – 26 September 1971) was a Finnish sailor. He competed in the 8 Metre event at the 1936 Summer Olympics.

References

External links
 

1913 births
1971 deaths
Finnish male sailors (sport)
Olympic sailors of Finland
Sailors at the 1936 Summer Olympics – 8 Metre
Sportspeople from Helsinki